The Dolley Madison Digital Edition (DMDE) is a born-digital comprehensive edition of the correspondence and ancillary documents of Dolley Payne Todd Madison. Rotunda, the electronic imprint of the University of Virginia Press, published the first installment of the edition in 2004; the final installment will appear in the Fall of 2021. The DMDE includes over 3,500 documents and 5,000 unique identifications of people, places, terms, and titles. The edition won the 2020 Lyman H. Butterfield Award from the Association for Documentary Editing. The DMDE was the first publication of Rotunda and is now available as part of Rotunda's American Founding Era Collection, where it can be included in searches across the entire collection alongside the papers of the founders.

Protocols
The DMDE attempts to identify every person, place, organization, and citation that is mentioned in the correspondence (or other documents such as newspaper articles, legal documents, and invitations).  Annotations are provided by associating names to text.  A list is provided in the left hand margin to facilitate searching.  In addition, the DMDE provides editorial notes to explain issues that transcend individual letters but have not been the subject of serious historical research and writing.  All documents are marked up in XML and conform to TEI.P5.  Readers can both browse and search the collection or pull up the complete set of annotations, called in this edition the "glossary."

History
The DMDE was created by Holly Cowan Shulman working in close collaboration with the Papers of James Madison and Rotunda.   The goal of the edition was and remains twofold: to provide a modern edition of Dolley Madison's correspondence; and to provide a model for a born-digital documentary edition in the field of history.
There are two previous editions of letters of Dolley Madison.  The first, edited by her great-niece, Lucia B. Cutts, was originally published in 1886. The second, edited by a Washington historian, Allen C. Clark, was published in 1914.  Both are highly selected and heavily bowdlerized.
The DMDE was preceded by a selective edition edited by Shulman and David B. Mattern, senior associate editor of the Papers of James Madison: The Selected Letters of Dolley Payne Madison, published in 2003 by the University of Virginia Press.

Reception 

The DMDE has been used by both academic and popular writers. Scholars who have cited the DMDE include historians such as Catherine Allgor, David Lynn Holmes, Annette Gordon-Reed,  Woody Holton, Caroline Winterer, and Douglas Houpt; and specialists in Digital Humanities such as Johanna Drucker  and Lauren F. Klein. Popular historians who have used the edition include Cokie Roberts, Elise K. Kirk, Elizabeth Dowling Taylor, and Jon Meacham.

The Dolley Madison Digital Edition won the Lyman H. Butterfield Award from the Association for Documentary Editing. In 2021 it was nominated for the J. Franklin Jameson Award from the American Historical Association.

Funding
The Dolley Madison Digital Edition was funded by the National Endowment for the Humanities, Virginia Humanities, and the National Historical Publications and Records Commission.

Staff

Current Staff 
Project Director

Holly Cowan Shulman

Managing Editor

Mary MacNeil

Senior Associate Editor

Amy Larrabee Cotz

Associate Editor

Mary Ann Lugo

Consulting Editors

 David Mattern
Ann Miller

Student Intern

Roshni Gorur

In addition, the following people have worked with the DMDE over the past eighteen years: Kristin O’Conner, Kristin M. Celello, Amy Minton Rider, Lauren Haummesser, Tina Buller, Stephanie Finn, Scott Matthews, Mia Morgan, Julie Doxsey, Erica Cavanaugh, Wilma Bradbeer, Helena Devereux, Ann Goedde, Michael Holt, Hadley Nagel, Katie Kellam, Kelley Seay, David Geraghty, Scott Matthews, Kara A. Leonard, Natalie M. Mich, Jennifer M. Stone, and Roshni Gorur

References

External links
 Rotunda
 Rotunda's American Founding Era Collection
 The Dolley Madison Digital Edition requires log-in and cookie activation
 The Dolley Madison Project
 American Experience: Dolley Madison PBS
 The Dolley Madison Papers
 Papers of James Madison

Reviews 

 History Matters
 teachinghistory.org
 Journal of American History
 MarkLogic

Articles 

 Penelope Kaiserlian, Journal of Scholarly Publishing, Volume 40, Number 1, October 2008.
 Phil Pochoda, University of Michigan Press: The Future of Scholarly Communication: On the Other Side of the Digital Tipping Point, Journal of Scholarly Publishing, Volume 40, Number 1, October 2008.
 Emma Rathbone, "Dolley Madison Goes Digital", Virginia Magazine, 11 May 2009.
 Holly C. Shulman, "Doing Digital History", History News Network.
 Carol Tenopir, "Database Marketplace 2008: Information with a Twist," Library Journal, 15 May 2008.
 Discussed in if:book, A project of the Institute for the Future of the Book, 21 February 2006.

Madison family